Abdulwahab Jaafer (born 15 September 1993) is a Saudi Arabian football player who currently plays for Al-Tai as a winger.

Honours

External links
 

Living people
1993 births
Association football midfielders
Saudi Arabian footballers
Al Tuhami Club players
Al-Shabab FC (Riyadh) players
Al-Hazem F.C. players
Al-Tai FC players
Saudi Professional League players
Saudi First Division League players
Place of birth missing (living people)